Evan Tlesla Adams (born November 15, 1966) is an Indigenous Canadian actor, playwright, and physician. A Coast Salish from the Sliammon First Nation near Powell River, British Columbia, he is best known internationally for his roles in the films of Sherman Alexie, as Thomas Builds-the-Fire in the 1998 film Smoke Signals and Seymour Polatkin in the 2002 film The Business of Fancydancing.

Career

Entertainment
He won an Independent Spirit Award in 1999 for Best Debut Performance for his role in Smoke Signals, and a Los Angeles Outfest award in 2002 for his role in Fancydancing.

In Canada, Adams has acted primarily in television, including roles in The Beachcombers, "Lost in the Barrens" Da Vinci's Inquest, Neon Rider, These Arms of Mine, Da Vinci's City Hall, The L Word, and Wolf Canyon, and stage roles in Lear and Dry Lips Oughta Move to Kapuskasing. He appeared in the 1990 made for TV movie "Lost in the Barrens". He also appeared in the documentary film Just Watch Me: Trudeau and the '70s Generation, speaking about his own experience as a young gay, First Nations man growing up in Canada during the Pierre Trudeau's era.

His plays, including Dreams of Sheep, Snapshots, Dirty Dog River and Janice's Christmas, have been produced across Canada and internationally.

He appears in the 2017 films Indian Horse and Kayak to Klemtu, and the 2020 film Indian Road Trip.

Medical 
Adams has also worked extensively with First Nations health programs in Canada, including HIV/AIDS education and alcohol and drug abuse treatment. In 2002, Adams completed a medical degree at the University of Calgary. He completed his residency at St. Paul's Hospital/UBC (as Chief Resident), a Masters of Public Health from Johns Hopkins University, and served as the Deputy Provincial Health Officer with the British Columbia Ministry of health. In April 2007, Adams was appointed the first-ever Aboriginal Health Physician Advisor for the province of British Columbia. In April 2012, Adams was made Deputy Provincial Health Officer for British Columbia by Dr. Perry Kendall. On December 1, 2014, Adams became the Chief Medical Officer of the First Nations Health Authority in British Columbia.

References

External links
 

20th-century Canadian dramatists and playwrights
21st-century Canadian dramatists and playwrights
Canadian male film actors
Canadian male stage actors
Canadian male television actors
First Nations male actors
First Nations dramatists and playwrights
Canadian gay actors
Canadian gay writers
Canadian LGBT dramatists and playwrights
Male actors from British Columbia
1966 births
Living people
Gay dramatists and playwrights
Canadian public health doctors
Canadian male dramatists and playwrights
Indspire Awards
20th-century Canadian male writers
21st-century Canadian male writers
20th-century First Nations writers
21st-century First Nations writers
LGBT First Nations people
First Nations academics
University of Calgary alumni
Johns Hopkins Bloomberg School of Public Health alumni
21st-century Canadian LGBT people
20th-century Canadian LGBT people